Fundamental parallelogram may mean:
 Fundamental pair of periods on the complex plane
 Primitive cell on the Euclidean plane